Yassine Akkouche, also known as Yacine Akkouche, (born July 28, 1984) is an Algerian footballer. He currently plays as a forward for CA Bordj Bou Arréridj in the Algerian Ligue Professionnelle 2.

Career
In the summer of 2009, Akkouche joined JS Kabylie from ORB Akbou after an impressive season where he finished as the team's top scorer and being chosen as the best player. On August 28, 2009, he made his debut for JS Kabylie in a league game against NA Hussein Dey.

References

1984 births
Living people
Association football forwards
Algerian footballers
JS Kabylie players
People from Akbou
MC Saïda players
Algerian Ligue Professionnelle 1 players
CA Bordj Bou Arréridj players
Algerian Ligue 2 players
21st-century Algerian people